Waya or WAYA may refer to:

People 
 Lawrence Waya (born 1963), Malawi football player
 Mary Waya (born 1968), netball player and coach
 Manasseh Lomole Waya, South Sudanese politician

Places 
 In Burma (Myanmar):
 Waya, Ayeyarwady, a village in Pathein Township, Ayeyarwady Region
 Waya, Magway, a village in Yesagyo Township, Magway Region
 Waya, Kani, a village in Kani Township, Sagaing Region
 Waya, Chaung-U, a village in Chaung-U Township, Sagaing Region
 Waya, Chad, a village in Guereda, Biltine, Chad
 Waya Island, an island in Fiji

Other uses 
 Waya, a French racehorse
 Waia language of Papua New Guinea 
 WAYA-FM, a Christian radio station in South Carolina, USA
 WAYA, former callsign of WQMT, a Spanish-language radio station in Tennessee, USA
 Waya! Uchuu Ichi no Osekkai Daisakusen, 2011 Japanese film

See also 
Waia (disambiguation)